Yellanki or "Vellanki" or "Vellanky" or "Ellanki" is a village in Ramannapeta mandal of Yadadri Bhuvanagiri District of the Indian state of Telangana. 
It comes under a cluster of 80 villages in Yadadri Bhuvanagiri District of Telangana. The interesting combination of tradition, history, heritage, and modernity is widely known for Ikat- the most typical weaving village. It is famous for the cotton Ikat dress material.

References 

Villages in Yadadri_Bhuvanagiri_district